Dichlorisone is a synthetic glucocorticoid corticosteroid which was never marketed.

References

Organochlorides
Diols
Diketones
Glucocorticoids
Pregnanes
Abandoned drugs